The 1983–84 Football League Cup (known as the Milk Cup for sponsorship reasons) was the 24th season of the Football League Cup, a knockout competition for England's top 92 football clubs. The competition started on 29 August 1983 and ended with the final replay 28 March 1984.

The final was contested by First Division teams Everton and Liverpool at Wembley Stadium in London. It was the first time that the final was played on a Sunday and the first time that the final was broadcast live on British TV. Liverpool beat Everton 1–0 after a replay, to win their fourth consecutive League Cup title.

First round

First Leg

Second Leg

Second round

First Leg

Second Leg

Third round

Ties

Replays

2nd Replays

3rd Replay

Fourth round

Ties

Replays

2nd Replay

Fifth Round

Ties

Replays

Semi-finals
Having already defeated Arsenal, Third Division underdogs Walsall were now faced with a visit to Anfield to take on Liverpool, winners for the previous three years, in the semi-finals. They held the hosts to a 2–2 draw before losing the return leg 2–0 at Fellows Park. In the other semi-final, Everton won the first leg 2–0 against Aston Villa and went through despite a 1–0 defeat in the return leg, setting the scene for the first major domestic cup final between the two Merseyside clubs.

First Leg

Second Leg

Final

Replay

References

General

LFC History Match Report
LFC History Match Report (Replay)

Specific

EFL Cup seasons
1983–84 domestic association football cups
Lea
Cup